Living Legends is the sixth studio album by American hip hop duo 8Ball & MJG. The album was released on May 11, 2004, by Bad Boy South. It spawned three singles "You Don't Want Drama", "Straight Cadillac Pimpin'" and "Forever". In addition to selling 750,000 copies to date, the album sold 121,000 copies in its first week and debuted to number three spot on the Billboard 200, making it 8Ball & MJG's highest charting album to date.

Track listing

Credits
Executive Producer: P. Diddy
Co-Executive Producer: Harve Pierre
Associate Executive Producer: Conrad "Rad" Dimanche
A&R: Conrad "Rad" Dimanche and Dewayne "Big Du" Martin, Maurice "Moetown' Lee
Project Manager: Gwendolyn Niles
Marketing: Tracey Waples, Suhailah Yoba and Ammanda Espinal
Creative Direction & Design: Christopher Stern
Photography: Jonathan Mannion
Background Photos: Abbey Katz
Associate Design: Marsha Porter
Styling: Mike B
Management: James E. McMillan Dumoe Management

Charts

Weekly charts

Year-end charts

Certifications

References

2004 albums
8Ball & MJG albums
Albums produced by Bangladesh (record producer)
Albums produced by Cool & Dre
Albums produced by Lil Jon